"Tonight (Best You Ever Had)" is a song by American singer-songwriter John Legend. It was written by Legend along with Allen Arthur, Keith Justice, Miguel, Clayton Reilly and Christopher Bridges, with Arthur, Justice and Reilly producing the song under their production moniker Phatboiz and Ludacris having featured vocals. The song served as the lead single from the soundtrack to the 2012 American romantic comedy film Think Like a Man, directed by Tim Story. 
"Tonight (Best You Ever Had)" peaked at number 12 on the US Billboard Hot R&B/Hip-Hop Songs and reached the lower half of the US Billboard Hot 100. It reached platinum status in the United States and earned a Grammy Award nomination for Best Rap/Sung Performance.

Track listing

Charts

Weekly charts

Year-end charts

Certifications

References

2012 singles
2012 songs
John Legend songs
Ludacris songs
Songs written by John Legend
Songs written by Ludacris
Songs written by Miguel (singer)